This article is a list of Arabian cities by population, ranking cities based on national census estimates for city limits.  The city proper definition is used for listing cities populations.  C stands for Census, E stands for official estimate.

Table of largest cities in Arabia

References

Lists of cities by population
Lists of cities in Asia
 
Cite